Margolies is a surname that, like its variants shown below, is derived from the Ashkenazi Hebrew pronunciation of the Hebrew word  (Israeli Hebrew , meaning 'pearls,' and may refer to:

Marjorie Margolies-Mezvinsky (born 1942), American politician from Philadelphia. 
Moses S. Margolies (1851 – 1936), Russian-born American Orthodox rabbi.
Rob Margolies, American film director and screenwriter 
Reuvein Margolies (1889 -1971), Israeli author and Talmudic scholar.
Michael R. Margolies (1966-present), American songwriter and English teacher.

See also
 Margolis
 Margules
 Margulis
 Margulies
 Margolus

Jewish surnames
Hebrew-language surnames